Robert William Wright (February 22, 1816 – January 9, 1885) was an American lawyer, politician, newspaper editor, and author who used the pseudonyms Horatius Flaccus and Quevedo Redivivus, Jr.

Biography
Wright, third son of Stephen and Zibrah (Richardson) Wright, was born in Ludlow, Vermont, February 22, 1816.  He graduated from Yale College in 1842.  For three years after graduation he was engaged in teaching in the public Grammar Schools in Boston, at the same time studying law. He was admitted to the bar in the autumn of 1845, and immediately went to Wisconsin Territory. He settled in the spring of 1846 in Waukesha (then Prairieville), where he resided for ten years, actively engaged in the practice of his profession. In the fall of 1852 he declined the Whig nomination for Congress in his district.

He left Wisconsin in the spring of 1856, intending to settle in Selma, Alabama; but the outlook being unfavorable, he went instead to Waterbury, Connecticut, where he remained for three years, engaged in the practice of law, and a part of the time editing a weekly newspaper, as well as serving for one year as Judge of Probate. From 1859 to 1872 his residence was in New Haven, and during most of that time he was engaged in journalism; he was also Executive Secretary of Governor James E. English for three years. From 1872 to 1883 he resided in Cheshire, Conn., still engaged in literary work; here also he served for one year as Judge of Probate.

From Cheshire he removed, late in 1883, to Cleveland, Ohio, where he died suddenly of congestion of the brain, January 9, 1885, at the age of 69.

He contributed largely to magazines, and printed a number of poems, chiefly satirical. In 1880 he published a volume called Life; its True Genesis (12mo pp 298), which he considered to be a complete refutation of the Darwinian theory of evolution; he was preparing a continuation of this work, when stricken with his last illness.

He married, August 13, 1844, Launne L., daughter of Capt. John Luke, of St. Armand, Lower Canada, who died May 29, 1851. He next married, October 14, 1852, Sarah L., daughter of the Rev. Job H. Martyn, of New York City, who survived him with one daughter and one son; of the five children by his first marriage, two sons are also living, the elder being a graduate of Yale Law School.

References

External links

1816 births
1885 deaths
Politicians from Selma, Alabama
Lawyers from Cleveland
People from Ludlow (town), Vermont
Politicians from Waterbury, Connecticut
Politicians from Waukesha, Wisconsin
Yale College alumni
Wisconsin lawyers
Connecticut lawyers
Wisconsin Whigs
19th-century American politicians
Connecticut state court judges
Editors of Connecticut newspapers
American male poets
Writers from Vermont
Journalists from Ohio
American male non-fiction writers
19th-century American judges
19th-century American lawyers